Erica Carroll is a Canadian actress. On TV, she has played Dottie Ramsey on When Calls the Heart, angel Hannah on Supernatural in seasons 9 and 10, the character Mrs. Rivera on the series Almost Human, Inza Nelson in Smallville. She has acted in movies such as Apollo 18 and Pressed, as well as acting and producing Afterparty.

Career
Carroll attended both The American Academy of Dramatic Arts in Los Angeles and The Gaiety School of Acting in Dublin, Ireland. She has made forays into both film and television, and her Television credits include Supernatural, Battlestar Galactica, and Fringe.

Filmography

Film

Television

Awards and nominations

References

External links
Facebook
 Twitter
 

Year of birth missing (living people)
Living people
Canadian film actresses
Canadian television actresses
Nerd culture
American Academy of Dramatic Arts alumni
Actresses from British Columbia